Matías David Rodríguez (born 14 December 1981) is an Argentine politician currently serving as a National Senator for Tierra del Fuego. A member of the Justicialist Party and La Cámpora, Rodríguez was elected in 2019, and currently sits in the Frente de Todos parliamentary bloc.

He previously served as a National Deputy from 2015 to 2019, and as head of the provincial branch of ANSES in Tierra del Fuego from 2012 to 2015.

Early and personal life
Rodríguez was born on 14 December 1981 in Ushuaia, Tierra del Fuego. He is married to Laura Beatriz Ávila and has two children.

Political career
Rodríguez became a supporter of former president Néstor Kirchner during his presidential campaign in 2003, when he became part of the "Kirchner Presidente" committee in Tierra del Fuego. Later, in 2007, Rodríguez was one of the founders of La Cámpora in the province.

In 2012, Rodríguez was appointed as chief of the Tierra del Fuego branch of ANSES, Argentina's national social security agency. Two years later, in the 2015 legislative election, he ran for a seat in the National Chamber of Deputies as the first candidate in the Front for Victory list. The list received 42.01% of the vote, and Rodríguez was comfortably elected alongside the next candidate in the list, Analuz Carol. They were sworn in on 4 December 2015.

As a national deputy, Rodríguez served as secretary on the parliamentary commission on small and medium-sized businesses (PyMES), and formed part of the commissions on commerce, finances, industry, and tourism.

In the 2019 legislative election, Rodríguez ran for one of Tierra del Fuego's three seats in the Argentine Senate as the first candidate in the Frente de Todos (FDT) list, followed by María Eugenia Duré. With 41.1% of the vote, the FDT was the most-voted list in Tierra del Fuego, and both Rodríguez and Duré were elected for the majority seats. As senator, he formed part of the commissions on accords, administrative and municipal affairs, national defense, and national economy and investment.

Rodríguez was a supporter of the legalisation of abortion in Argentina, voting in favour of the Voluntary Interruption of Pregnancy Bill in 2018 as deputy and in 2020 as senator.

References

External links

Profile on the official website of the Senate 

1981 births
Living people
People from Ushuaia
Members of the Argentine Senate for Tierra del Fuego
Members of the Argentine Chamber of Deputies elected in Tierra del Fuego
Justicialist Party politicians
Members of La Cámpora
21st-century Argentine politicians
21st-century Argentine women politicians